John Peacock may refer to:

Joe Peacock (John Peacock, 1897–1979), England international footballer
John Peacock (piper) (c. 1756–1817), player of the Northumbrian smallpipes, probable author of the earliest printed book of music for the instrument
John Peacock (songwriter) (died 1867), English poet and songwriter
John Peacock (footballer) (born 1956), manager of the England national under-17 football team
John Peacock (writer) (1945–2017), british writer, screenwriter
John A. Peacock (born 1956), professor of cosmology at the University of Edinburgh 
John Michael Peacock, England-born frontier leader and politician of the Cape Colony
John Thomas Peacock (1827–1905), New Zealand politician
Johnny Peacock (1910–1981), American baseball catcher
Johnny Peacock (American football) (born 1947), American football player
Jonnie Peacock (born 1993), English paralympic sprint runner

See also
 Peacock (surname)